Blank is a 2009 French drama, written and directed by Cyril de Gasperis. Its original French title is L'absence.

Plot
Home care assistant, Felicia is charged with spending her days with Anna, a woman in her sixties who suffers from dementia and requires constant care. When Anna's husband vanishes, the two women then continue their life together in a world apart, losing slowly all sense of time and self.

Cast
 Cécile Coustillac as Felicia
 Liliane Rovère as Anna
 Jocelyne Desverchère as Michelle
 Jean-Baptiste Malartre as Christian
 Adrien de Van as Paul
 Eddie Chignara as Bob

Festival
 Pusan International Film Festival (World Cinema)

External links
  
 
 

2009 films
2000s French-language films
2009 drama films
French drama films
2000s French films